The 2015–16 season was Sheffield United's 127th season in their history and their fifth consecutive season in League One. Along with League One, the club also competed in the FA Cup, League Cup and Football League Trophy. The season covers the period from 1 July 2015 to 30 June 2016.

Season overview

Pre-season
Following another failed play-off campaign, manager Nigel Clough was sacked with the club board stating "A change in direction was necessary for the forthcoming season." After having an enquiry about Bradford City's Phil Parkinson to succeed Clough, on 2 June Nigel Adkins was installed as Sheffield United's new manager. On 13 July, Diego De Girolamo signed a new two-year contract with the Blades, having initially rejecting a new offer. The following day, United announced the signing of Martyn Woolford on a free-transfer with him committing to Bramall Lane on a two-year deal.

Transfers

Transfers in

Transfers out

Total income:  £1,500,000

Loans in

Loans out

Contracts
New contracts and contract extensions.

Competitions

Pre-season friendlies
On 4 June 2015, Sheffield United announce they will play Newcastle United for Chris Morgan's testimonial. On 9 June 2015, a confirmed list of the club's pre-season schedule was released.

League One

League table

Results by matchday

Matches

FA Cup

League Cup
On 16 June 2015, the first round draw was made, Sheffield United were drawn away against Morecambe. In the second round, the Blades were drawn away to Fulham.

Football League Trophy
On 8 August 2015, live on Soccer AM the draw for the first round of the Football League Trophy was drawn by Toni Duggan and Alex Scott. In the second round draw, made on 5 September 2015, the Blades were drawn at home to Notts County.

References

Sheffield United F.C. seasons
Sheffield United